18 Hronia Live, also referred to as 18XL, is a live album by popular Greek singer Katy Garbi recorded and released in 2007 by Sony BMG Greece. The album is her first live album; a double disk compilation of songs performed during a special charity concert held in Egaleo, Greece.

A Gold certification was awarded on March 11, 2008 at an elaborate party, whose attendance included many of Garbi's longtime collaborators and fellow singers.

Release
The initial paperback album cover was originally detailed to incorporate a metallic gold title situated upon a full cover collage of images throughout Garbi's solo career. However, upon the album's release the decision was made to change the title font colour to scarlet, increasing the contrast between collage and title. The first release on December 5 also had the collage continue along the back cover, and an inner booklet containing song titles, various photos and a double paged message from Katy addressing her fans, thanking her collaborators and explaining her song choices.

December 31 brought the release of the reissue of 18 Hronia Live, after a second decision was passed by Sony BMG to include a track listing at the back of the album cover.

Track listing

Disc 1

Disc 2

Singles
The following singles were officially released to radio stations. Additional songs such as, "Esena Mono  ", "Taxeia ", and "Sou 'ho Etimi Sygnomi", despite not having been released as singles, managed to gain radio airplay and internet release.

"Mi Ta Fila Ta Matia Sou"
The single was the first released to all radio stations as the primary single of the album. It is a live cover of Vicky Moscholiou's 1970's hit, and as Katy stated in her Mad Tv interview in 2008, she really admires Moscholiou as one of Greece's founding artists. It was announced as the leading single by the album's producer - Poseidonas Giannopoulos - at the beginning of his radio program on Greece's "Sfera FM" during which he aired the track's first official broadcast. A music video was not produced as the concert's location was not appropriately fit for video recording.

"18 Hronia Live Medley"

A short medley of three simultaneous and corresponding live tracks was announced as the follow-up single. The three tracks were all previously released hit singles from Garbi's studio albums Atofio Hrysafi, Tou Feggariou Anapnoes and Doro Theou. The single's release was denounced and halted as a result of its corresponding music videos's cancellation, although the three tracks did gain airplay separately.
Music Video
It was announced on the artist's official website that renowned director and Garbi's long-time collaborator 'Giorgos Kavalas' would be creating the album's first music video. His concept, due to the unfortunate lack of video footage from the concert, was to create a dedication to Garbi's 18 years of live performances (reflecting the album's theme) through archive video material, however it was decided that this video would not go ahead as it Sony was already focusing on Garbi's next discographical move and also due to the album's limited success on the charts.

"Se Sfalma Epeses Kardia Mou"
Se Sfalma Epeses Kardia Mou was officially released as the next single of the Garbi's live album. It was announced and released on her myspace. This song is also a cover of a well-known Greek song.

"I Proti Mas Fora"
The strong ballad 'I Proti Mas Fora' was originally released by Giannis Kotsiras in 1999; Katy Garbi's live rendition is found as the last track on the first disk. The single gained a moderate amount of airplay in Athens. The audience can be heard singing along with Garbi in the final chorus, with a quite tense but solemn atmospheric vibe.

Charts

References

Greek-language live albums
Katy Garbi live albums
2007 live albums
Sony Music Greece live albums
Columbia Records live albums